Maitha is a village in Kanpur Dehat district in the state of Uttar Pradesh, India.Maitha is founded new  tehsil  in Kanpur Dehat district and comes under Kanpur Metropolitan Area

Maitha Village
Maitha village is situated from Maitha Railway Station  towards north -east at a distance 10 kilometer. maitha is block.most popular birth place of swami baskranand saraswati and his temple & mata sumbaha devi temple.

Maitha Railway Station
In the name of Maitha is a Railway Station on the route North Central Railway between Kanpur Central and Etawah. The passengers trains are available here towards east to Kanpur and towards west to Etawah. There is also a settlement near Maitha Railway Station. It has shops, schools, petrol pump and some restaurants also.

Maitha Tehsil
Head quarter of Maitha Tehsil is at village Vairi Dariyav. This tehsil has only one development block named Maitha.

 HEADQUARTER of MAITHA BLOCK is at village MAITHA

Transport
Bus and taxi are available. Maitha Railway Station to Tehsil head quarter Maitha and village Maitha. Jasvantpur mugra away far 15 km
Bus available maitha to kanpur nagar and maitha to rania akbarpur etawah

Cng buses available maitha to kanpur nagar

Maitha to Rania Akbarpur

Taxi available

Maitha to kalyanpur

Maitha to kisan nagar

Educational and institution
1- Rohan Singh inter collage

2- Swami Bhaskaranand inter collage

3- Ram Janki collage of law 5 km from Maitha

4- Girijesh Degree College Maith

5-Jhalkari bai iti Maitha

6-SGM CHILDREN ACADEMY

7-KND PUBLIC SCHOOL

8-ASTITVA MODERN PUBLIC SCHOOL

Geography

References

Villages in Kanpur Dehat district